The Resource Conservation and Recovery Act (RCRA), enacted in 1976, is the principal federal law in the United States governing the disposal of solid waste and hazardous waste.

History and goals
Congress enacted RCRA to address the increasing problems the nation faced from its growing volume of municipal and industrial waste. RCRA was an amendment of the Solid Waste Disposal Act of 1965. The act set national goals for:
 Protecting human health and the natural environment from the potential hazards of waste disposal.
 Energy conservation and natural resources.
 Reducing the amount of waste generated, through source reduction and recycling
 Ensuring the management of waste in an environmentally sound manner.

The RCRA program is a joint federal and state endeavor, with the U.S. Environmental Protection Agency (EPA) providing basic requirements that states then adopt, adapt, and enforce. RCRA is now most widely known for the regulations promulgated under it that set standards for the treatment, storage and disposal of hazardous waste in the United States. However, it also plays an integral role in the management of municipal and industrial waste as well as underground storage tanks.

Implementation
EPA has published waste management regulations, which are codified in Title 40 of the Code of Federal Regulations at parts 239 through 282. Regulations regarding management of hazardous waste begin in part 260. States are authorized to operate their own hazardous waste programs, which must be at least as stringent as federal standards, and are tasked with creating state implementation plans for managing solid waste.

In California, the Department of Toxic Substances Control (DTSC) is the primary authority enforcing the RCRA requirements, as well as the California Hazardous Waste Control Law (HWCL) of 1972.

Provisions

Subtitle A: General Provisions
 Congressional Findings; Objectives and National Policy
 Definitions
 Interstate Cooperation; Application of Act and Integration with Other Acts
 Financial Disclosure; Solid Waste Management Information and Guidelines

Subtitle B: Office of Solid Waste; Authorities of the Administrator
 Office of Solid Waste and Interagency Coordinating Committee
 Authorities of EPA Administrator
 Resource Recovery and Conservation Panels; Grants
 Annual Report; Office of Ombudsman

Subtitle C: "Cradle to Grave" requirements for hazardous waste
Arguably the most notable provisions of the RCRA statute are included in Subtitle C, which directs EPA to establish controls on the management of hazardous wastes from their point of generation, through their transportation and treatment, storage and/or disposal. Because RCRA requires controls on hazardous waste generators (i.e., sites that generate hazardous waste), transporters, and treatment, storage and disposal facilities (i.e., facilities that ultimately treat/dispose of or recycle the hazardous waste), the overall regulatory framework has become known as the "cradle to grave" system. States are authorized to implement their own hazardous waste programs. The statute imposes stringent recordkeeping and reporting requirements on generators, transporters, and operators of treatment, storage and disposal facilities handling hazardous waste.

Subtitle D: Non-hazardous Solid Wastes
Subtitle D provides criteria for landfills and other waste disposal facilities, and banned open landfills. EPA published its initial standards in 1979 for "sanitary" landfills that receive municipal solid waste. The "solid waste" definition includes garbage (e.g., food containers, coffee grounds), non-recycled household appliances, residue from incinerated automobile tires, refuse such as metal scrap, construction materials, and sludge from industrial and sewage treatment plants and drinking water treatment plants. Subtitle D also exempted certain hazardous wastes from the Subtitle C regulations, such as hazardous wastes from households and from conditionally exempt small quantity generators.

Special wastes
In 1980 Congress designated several kinds of industrial wastes as "special wastes," which are exempt from Subtitle C, including oil and gas exploration and production wastes (such as drill cuttings, produced water, and drilling fluids), coal combustion residuals generated by electric power plants and other industries, mining waste, and cement kiln dust. See Solid Waste Disposal Amendments of 1980.

Subtitle E: Department of Commerce responsibilities
 Development of Specifications for secondary materials; Development of markets for recovered material.
 Technology promotion

Subtitle F: Federal responsibilities
 Application of Federal, State and Local Law to Federal Facilities
 Federal procurement
 Cooperation with EPA; Applicability of solid waste disposal guidelines to executive agencies

Subtitle G: Miscellaneous provisions
 Whistleblower protection. Employees in the United States who believe they were fired or suffered another adverse action related to enforcement of this law have 30 days to file a written complaint with the Occupational Safety and Health Administration.
 Citizen Suits; Imminent Hazard suits
 Petition for regulations; Public participation

Subtitle H: Research, Development, Demonstration and Information
 Research, Demonstrations, Training; Special Studies
 Coordination, collection, dissemination of information

Subtitle I: Underground Storage Tanks
Background
The operation of underground storage tanks (USTs) became subject to the RCRA regulatory program with enactment of the Hazardous and Solid Waste Amendments of 1984 (HSWA). At that time there were about 2.1 million tanks subject to federal regulation, and the EPA program led to closure and removal of most substandard tanks. As of 2009 there were approximately 600,000 active USTs at 223,000 sites subject to federal regulation.

Regulatory requirements
The federal UST regulations cover tanks storing petroleum or listed hazardous substances, and define the types of tanks permitted. EPA established a tank notification system to track UST status. UST regulatory programs are principally administered by state and U.S. territorial agencies.

The regulations set standards for:
 Groundwater monitoring
 Secondary Containment
 Release detection, prevention and correction
 Spill prevention
 Overfill prevention (for petroleum products)
 Restrictions on land disposal of untreatable hazardous waste products.

The Superfund Amendments and Reauthorization Act of 1986 (SARA) required owners and operators of USTs to ensure corrective action is completed when a tank is in need of repair, or removal, when it is necessary to protect human health and the environment. The amendments established a trust fund to pay for the cleanup of leaking UST sites where responsible parties cannot be identified.

It is also recommended that above-ground storage tanks are used whenever possible.

Subtitle J: Medical Waste (expired)
RCRA Subtitle J regulated medical waste in four states (New York, New Jersey, Connecticut, Rhode Island) and Puerto Rico, and expired on March 22, 1991. (See Medical Waste Tracking Act.) State environmental and health agencies regulate medical waste, rather than EPA. Other federal agencies have issued safety regulations governing the handling of medical waste, including the Centers for Disease Control and Prevention, Occupational Safety and Health Administration, and the Food and Drug Administration.

Amendments and related legislation

Solid Waste Disposal Amendments of 1980
Congress exempted several types of wastes from classification as hazardous under Subtitle C in its 1980 amendment to RCRA. The Solid Waste Disposal Amendments of 1980 designated the following categories as "special wastes" and not subject to the stricter permitting requirements of Subtitle C:
 coal combustion residuals (CCR) generated by electric power plants and other industries, including fly ash, bottom ash, slag waste and flue-gas desulfurization wastes
 mining waste from ore mines and mineral mines
 cement kiln dust
 drilling fluid, produced water, and other wastes from oil and gas wells.
These legislative exemptions, known as the "Bevill exclusion" and the "Bentsen exclusion", were intended to be temporary, pending studies conducted by EPA and subsequent determinations as to whether any of these waste categories should be classified as hazardous. In its reviews following the 1980 amendments, EPA determined that most of the exempted waste types would continue to be classified as non-hazardous.

Regulations
EPA published a CCR regulation in 2015 that would restrict the continued use of unlined ash ponds (surface impoundments) by coal-fired power plants. This regulation, was which was modified by the Trump administration in 2018, has been challenged in litigation and remanded to EPA for further revision by the United States Court of Appeals for the District of Columbia Circuit. In response to the court decision, EPA published a proposed rule on December 2, 2019 that would establish an August 31, 2020 deadline for facilities to stop placing ash in unlined impoundments. The proposal would also provide additional time for some facilities—up to eight years—to find alternatives for managing ash wastes before closing surface impoundments.

Superfund
The Comprehensive Environmental Response, Compensation, and Liability Act (CERCLA), also known as "Superfund," was enacted in 1980 to address the problem of remediating abandoned hazardous waste sites, by establishing legal liability, as well as a trust fund for cleanup activities. In general CERCLA applies to contaminated sites, while RCRA's focus is on controlling the ongoing generation and management of particular waste streams. RCRA, like CERCLA, has provisions to require cleanup of contaminated sites that occurred in the past.

Hazardous and Solid Waste Amendments of 1984
In 1984 Congress expanded the scope of RCRA with the enactment of Hazardous and Solid Waste Amendments (HSWA). The amendments strengthened the law by covering small quantity generators of hazardous waste and establishing requirements for hazardous waste incinerators, and the closing of substandard landfills.

Land Disposal Program Flexibility Act of 1996
The Land Disposal Program Flexibility Act of 1996 allowed some flexibility in the procedures for land disposal of certain wastes. For example, a waste is not subject to land disposal restrictions if it is sent to an industrial wastewater treatment facility, a municipal sewage treatment plant, or is treated in a "zero discharge" facility.

Treatment, storage, and disposal facility permits

Treatment, storage, and disposal facilities (TSDFs) manage hazardous waste under RCRA Subtitle C and generally must have a permit in order to operate. While most facilities have RCRA permits, some continue to operate under what is called "interim status."  Interim status requirements appear in 40 CFR Part 265.

The permitting requirements for TSDFs appear in 40 CFR Parts 264 and 270. TSDFs manage (treat, store, or dispose) hazardous waste in units that may include: container storage areas, tanks, surface impoundments, waste piles, land treatment units, landfills, incinerators, containment buildings, and/or drip pads. The unit-specific permitting and operational requirements are described in further detail in 40 CFR Part 264, Subparts J through DD.

See also
 Clean Water Act
 Formerly Used Defense Sites
 Hazardous waste in the United States
 Solid waste policy in the United States
 Uranium Mill Tailings Radiation Control Act

References

External links

 RCRA Orientation Manual (EPA, 2014): A good textbook-length introduction to RCRA
 RCRA Online: database of documents covering a wide range of RCRA issues and topics
 "Hazardous Waste Permitting Process: A Citizens Guide" - EPA
 Waste Management: A Half Century of Progress, a report by the EPA Alumni Association
 Collected Papers of William Sanjour, a retired EPA employee and whistleblower

External links
 As codified in 42 U.S.C. chapter 82 of the United States Code from the LII
 As codified in 42 U.S.C. chapter 82 of the United States Code from the US House of Representatives
 Solid Waste Disposal Act aka Resource Conservation and Recovery Act (PDF/details) as amended in the GPO Statute Compilations collection
 Summary of the RCRA from the EPA

1976 in law
94th United States Congress
United States business law
First Amendment to the United States Constitution
Public administration
United States Environmental Protection Agency
United States federal environmental legislation
Waste legislation in the United States
Whistleblower protection legislation
1976 in the environment